A.O. Kardia F.C. is a Greek Football club based in Kardia, Thessaloniki. In 2015–16 they were promoted to the third tier of Greek football.

External links
Facebook webpage

Football clubs in Central Macedonia
Thessaloniki (regional unit)
Gamma Ethniki clubs
Association football clubs established in 1958
1958 establishments in Greece